Don Bosco School may refer to:

India

 Don Bosco Academy, Patna
 Don Bosco School, Katihar, Bihar
 Arpit Anshu Raj
 Assam Don Bosco University
 Don Bosco College of Engineering, in Goa
 Don Bosco High School (Imphal)

 Don Bosco School (Alaknanda, New Delhi)
 St. Don Bosco's College, Lakhimpur Kheri
 Don Bosco High & Technical School, Liluah, Howrah, West Bengal
 Don Bosco School, Bandel, West Bengal
 Don Bosco School, Park Circus, Kolkata
 Don Bosco Higher Secondary School, Irinjalakuda, Kerala
 Don Bosco School Ernakulam, Kerala
 Don Bosco Matriculation Higher Secondary School, Egmore, Chennai
 Don Bosco High School (Matunga), Mumbai
 Don Bosco High School, Guwahati
 Don Bosco High School, Hojai
 Don Bosco High School, Vadodara
 Don Bosco Institute of Technology, Bangalore
 Don Bosco Institute of Technology, Mumbai
 Don Bosco School, Kokar, Ranchi, Jharkhand 
 Don Bosco High School, Bandlaguda, Hyderabad 
 Don Bosco High School, Baghchung
 Don Bosco School, Purnea, Bihar

 Don Bosco School, Darbhanga, Bihar 
 Don Bosco Convent School, Jhanjharpur, Bihar
 Don Bosco Academy, Begusarsai, Bihar 
 Don Bosco School, Chitradurga 
 Don Bosco Central School, Mannuthy, Thrissur, Kerala
 [[Don Bosco Higher Secondary School, Mannuthy, Thrissur, Kerala
 Don Bosco School,Siliguri, West Bengal 
 Don Bosco School, Oodlabari, Jalpaiguri, West Bengal 
Don Bosco Industrial Training Institute Kolar Gold Fields

Pakistan

 Don Bosco Catholic School, Bannu

The Philippines

 Caritas Don Bosco School, Biñan
 Don Bosco College, Canlubang
 Don Bosco Technical College, Mandaluyong
 Don Bosco Technical College–Cebu
 Don Bosco Technical Institute, Makati
 Don Bosco Technical Institute, Tarlac
 Don Bosco Technical Institute, Victorias
 Don Bosco Academy, Pampanga
 Don Bosco School, Manila

United States 

 Don Bosco Technical Institute, Rosemead, California
 Don Bosco Cristo Rey High School, Takoma Park, Maryland
 Don Bosco High School, now part of Saint Thomas More High School, Saint Francis, Wisconsin
 Don Bosco Preparatory High School, Ramsey, New Jersey
 Don Bosco Technical High School (Boston), Massachusetts
 Don Bosco Technical High School (New Jersey), Paterson, New Jersey (closed 2002)
 Don Bosco High School (Iowa)
 St. John Bosco High School, Bellflower, California
 Salesian High School (Richmond), California
 Salesian High School (New Rochelle), New York

Other countries

 Don Bosco Cambodia
 Don Bosco Catholic Secondary School, Ontario, Canada

See also
 Don Bosco Institute of Technology (disambiguation)
List of Salesian schools
 St John Bosco College (disambiguation)